Baba Rostam (also Romanized as Bābā Rostam) is a village in Heydariyeh Rural District, Govar District, Gilan-e Gharb County, Kermanshah Province, Iran. At the 2006 census, its population was 240, in 51 families.

References 

Populated places in Gilan-e Gharb County